Fang Yanqiao (born 18 January 1989 in Beijing) is a Chinese swimmer, who competed for Team China at the 2008 Summer Olympics.

Major achievements
2008 World Open Water Championships – 12th 10 km
2010 World Open Water Championships – 3rd 10 km

See also
China at the 2012 Summer Olympics – Swimming

References

1989 births
Living people
Swimmers from Beijing
Chinese female long-distance swimmers
Olympic swimmers of China
Swimmers at the 2008 Summer Olympics